By the Sword of My Father is the second studio album of the musical project Folkearth.

Track listing

 "Introduction" — 4:24  
 "The Lady's Gift" — 3:48
 "By the Sword of My Father" — 5:26
 "Naglfar Sets Sail" — 5:18
 "The Death of Beowulf" — 6:04
 "Instrumental" — 4:24  
 "Skaldic Art" — 4:04 
 "Domain of Darksome Ravens" — 5:39
 "Returne to Waelhalle" — 4:41 
 "Heathenpride" — 8:43
 "Elves" — 1:29
 "Invictus" — 6:08
 "Wisdom of Wolves" — 2:50
 "Sailing A'Viking" — 2:08
 "Tribute to Viking Gods" — 4:04 
 "Journey Ends (outro)" — 3:23
I:"Heathenpride" is Falkenbach cover recorded for tribute album An Hommage to Falkenbach, Part I

Personnel
Greece
Marios "Prince Imrahil" Koutsoukos (Dol Amroth) - vocal, keyboard
Stefanos Koutsoukos (Dol Amroth) - bass
Nikos Nezeritis (Dol Amroth) - acoustic guitar
Hildr Valkyrie (Hildr Valkyrie) - vocal, keyboard

Lithuania
Ruslanas - spoken vocal

Austria
Alex "Hugin" Wieser (Uruk-Hai) - keyboard

United Kingdom
Athelstan (Forefather) - electric guitar, drum programming, vocal
Wulfstan (Forefather) - vocal

Sweden
Magnus Wohlfart (Nae'blis) - electric guitar, keyboard, vocal
Jeremy Child (Yggdrasil) - drums
Niklas Olausson (Broken Dagger) - vocal
Daniel Fredriksson (Otyg) - medieval lute, jaw harp
Simon Frodeberg - bass
Kristofer Janiec - violin
Michelle Maas - vocal
Daniel Pettersson (Pettersson & Fredriksson) - keyed fiddle

Germany
Tobias Andrelang - bass
Achim Eberle - percussion
Ralf Gruber - drums, percussion
Bernd Intveen (Van Lagen) - electric guitar
Sabine Stelzer (Van Lagen) - bagpipes, flute, schalmey, percussion
Marcus Van Langen (Van Lagen) - acoustic guitar, saz, bass, percussion, Viking flute, vocal
André Groschopp (Thiasos Dionysos) - electric guitar, keyboard, vocal, tin whistle, violin, drums

United States
Mark Riddick (The Soil Bleeds Black) - recorder, percussion

Italy
Axel (Death Army) - electric guitar, bass, vocals
Becky - Celtic harp
Alessandro Caruso (Hysterya) - drums, percussion
Francesca Crotti - violin
Igor Saviola - vocals
Raven - Celtic harp
Ulven (Draugen) - acoustic guitar

Production
all lyrics except "The Lady's Gift" and "A Tribute to Viking Gods" by Marios Koutsoukos
lyrics for "The Lady's Gift" by Wulfstan
lyrics for "A Tribute to Viking Gods" by Marcus Van Langen
music on "Returne to Waelhalle" by Hildr Valkyrie
artwork and cd design by Mark Riddick

See also
 Prince Imrahil (Middle-earth)

References

2006 albums
Folkearth albums